Bagdaneh (also Romanized as Bagdāneh; also known as Bīgdāneh and Yekdāneh) is a village in Kuh Mareh Sorkhi Rural District, Arzhan District, Shiraz County, Fars Province, Iran. At the 2006 census, its population was 884, in 188 families. It is located in a valley in a mountainous part of the country.

References 

Populated places in Shiraz County